Kim Hye-jin may refer to:

 Kim Hye-jin (actress) (born 1975), South Korean actress
 Kim Hyejin (born 1983), South Korean writer (author of Concerning My Daughter)
 Kim Hye-jin (gymnast) (born 1991), South Korean rhythmic gymnast
 Kim Hye-jin (swimmer) (born 1994), South Korean swimmer
 Hyejin Kim (novelist), South Korean novelist (author of Jia: A Novel of North Korea)

See also
Kim Hae-jin (born 1997), South Korean figure skater